Boogie is a musical technique or rhythm.

Boogie may also refer to:

Music
 Boogie (genre), a post-disco genre from 1980s
 Boogie rock, a genre of rock which reached the height of its popularity in the 1970s

Albums 
 Boogie (album), a compilation album by The Jackson 5

Songs
 "Boogie", 2011 single by Mandy Rain
 "Boogie", a song by Brockhampton from Saturation III
 "Boogie Oogie Oogie", a song by the American band A Taste of Honey

People

 Boogie (photographer) (born 1969), Serbian-American photographer
 Boogie (rapper) (born 1989), American hip-hop artist
 Boogie, nickname of DeMarcus Cousins (born 1990), American basketball player
 boogie2988, nickname of Steven Jay Williams (born 1974), American YouTube personality
 BooG!e, nickname of Bobby Bowman, American actor who played T-Bo on iCarly
 Boogie Ellis (born 2000), American basketball player

Film and fictional characters
 Boogie, the oily, a character from comic strips in Argentina, created by Roberto Fontanarrosa
 Boogie (2008 film), Romanian dramedy directed by Radu Muntean, starring Dragoş Bucur and Anamaria Marinca
 Boogie (2009 film), Argentine animated film based on the comic strip character Boogie el aceitoso
 Boogie (2021 film), American drama film written and directed by Eddie Huang, starring Taylor Takahashi, Taylour Paige and Jorge Lendeborg Jr.

Games
 Boogie (video game), a video game for the Wii, DS and PlayStation 2

Other uses
 Boogie man, alternate spelling of bogeyman
 Boogie boogie boogie!, expression used by Dick Cavett and Groucho Marx
 Booger (mucus), the United States slang term for nasal mucus

See also
 Bogey (disambiguation)
 Bogie (disambiguation)
 Buggie (disambiguation)
 Buggy (disambiguation)
 Bugi (disambiguation)
 Bougie (disambiguation)